Vista Del Lago High School is a high school located in Folsom, California. It is one of five high schools in the Folsom Cordova Unified School District. The school opened in 2007 to serve the southern side of Folsom and to relieve overcrowding at Folsom High School. The official school colors are navy blue and silver. It is one of the only schools in the Folsom Cordova Unified School District to use block scheduling. The mascot is the eagle. Vista del Lago's first class graduated in May 2010.

The 2009-10 school year was the first to include all grade levels (9-12). The prior year's (2008–09) enrollment was 951 students, with grades 9-11. The 2007-08 school year included only grades 9 and 10.

Academics
Vista del Lago is known for its high academic standards. Since 2009 its Academic Performance Index was 845. That score makes Vista the frontrunner out of all the high schools in the area. In addition, it has a variety of extracurricular academic clubs, such as Math Club, Science Olympiad, and Science Bowl, and performs well at the Regional Science Bowl, in addition to winning several awards at Academic Decathlon competition, such as winning 5th place overall at a competition at CSUS recently.

Demographics
The Vista del Lago student body is 71% white, 10%  Asian, 7% Hispanic, 8% black, 2% two races or more, 1% Filipino, and 1% American Indian.

Student government
Vista del Lago has an Associated Student Body (ASB) system. The Student Government is divided into two parts: ASB Officers and Class Officers. ASB Is led by the ASB president who leads the other ASB officers and class officers. Each class also has its own officers including a President, Vice-president, Secretary, Treasurer, and Spirit Representative.  The public face of student government are the PRC's (Public Relations Commissioner). They serve as MC's at events, lead rallies, etc. Student Government, through the ASB Vice-president, also oversees a Student Senate. The Senate is composed of one elected student from each of the schools advisory classes. Senate has its own leadership structure, including Senate Co-Presidents, Secretary, and Class Leads. They meet throughout the month to assist Student Government. Senate can also introduce new school rules to be voted on. They are then sent to Student Government and to the Administration.

Athletics
Vista del Lago currently is a member of the Capital Athletic League. This conference is part of the CIF Sac Joaquin Section, and the Eagles are currently a Division 3 school. Since joining the SVC in 2007, the Eagles have won all of the section and league titles. Fall sports include: Football, Cross Country, Girls Golf, Boys Soccer, and Girls Volleyball. Winter sports include: Boys Basketball, Girls Basketball, and Wrestling. Spring Sports include: Track, Swimming, Boys Golf, Boys Volleyball, Baseball, Softball, Boys Tennis, Girls Soccer. All sports programs allow for student participation grade level 9-12.

References

External links
 VDLHS Website
 Logo
 

High schools in Sacramento County, California
Public high schools in California
Folsom, California
2007 establishments in California